Chaffetz is a variation of the surname Heifetz. Notable people with the surname include:

Jason Chaffetz (born 1967), American politician
Hammond Chaffetz (1907–2001), federal prosecutor and partner at Kirkland & Ellis

See also
Chaifetz